Sammy Giammalva Jr. and Tony Giammalva were the defending champions, but lost in the final this year.

Ken Flach and Robert Seguso won the title, defeating Scott Davis and David Pate 4–6, 6–3, 7–6(9–7) in the final.

Seeds

Draw

Draw

External links
 Draw

Tokyo Indoor
1985 Grand Prix (tennis)